Crassispira tyloessa is an extinct species of sea snail, a marine gastropod mollusk in the family Pseudomelatomidae, the turrids and allies.

Description
The length of the shell attains 13.4 mm, its diameter 5.8 mm.

Distribution
Fossils have been found in Miocene strata in Panama; age range: 11.608 to 7.246 Ma.

References

 W. P. Woodring. 1970. Geology and paleontology of canal zone and adjoining parts of Panama: Description of Tertiary mollusks (gastropods: Eulimidae, Marginellidae to Helminthoglyptidae). United States Geological Survey Professional Paper 306(D):299–452

tyloessa
Gastropods described in 1970